A by-election for the seat of Kew was held on the 17th of April 1971 following the resignation of then Deputy Premier, Arthur Rylah. The by-election was won by Liberal candidate, Rupert Hamer, he won with a 64.8% primary vote and a swing of 23.1% in his primary vote.

Background 
Since it was first created in 1927, the electoral district of Kew has typically been a safe seat for the Liberal Party.

The by-election was called after the sitting member and Deputy Premier at the time, Arthur Rylah, resigned from parliament. Rylah's resignation followed a failed attempt from members of the local East Kew branch to challenge his preselection. A month after Rylah's resignation announcement, he has collapsed at his desk and spent the following four months in hospital.

Candidates 
A total of 3 candidates ran in the by-election.

Results 

 Preferences were not distributed as Hamer won with an absolute majority of votes (50% of votes).

See also 
 List of Victorian state by-elections

Further reading

References 

1971 elections in Australia
Victorian state by-elections
1970s in Victoria (Australia)
April 1971 events in Australia